Pansophism, in older usage often pansophy, is a concept in the educational system of universal knowledge proposed by John Amos Comenius, a Czech educator. "[Comenius's] second great interest was in furthering the Baconian attempt at the organization of all human knowledge. He became one of the leaders in the encyclopædic or pansophic movement of the seventeenth century".

Pansophic principle
The pansophic principle is one of the important principles of Comenius: that everything must be taught to everyone, as a guiding basis for education, something like universal education (Characteristica universalis).

Pansophism was a term used generally by Comenius to describe his pedagogical philosophy. His book Pansophiae prodromus (1639) was published in London with the cooperation of Samuel Hartlib. It was followed by Pansophiae diatyposis. Pansophy in this sense has been defined as ‘full adult comprehension of the divine order of things’. He aimed to set up a Pansophic College, a precursor of later academic institutes He wrote his ideas for this in a tract Via lucis, written 1641/2 in London; he had to leave because the English Civil War was breaking out, and this work was eventually printed in 1668, in Amsterdam.

The term was not original, having been applied by Bartolomeo Barbaro of Padua in his De omni scibili libri quadraginta: seu Prodromus pansophiae, from the middle of the sixteenth century.

Pansophic Freemasonry
A group within Freemasonry is called Pansophic Freemasonry.

References

External links
 .

Pedagogy